Battery Records was an American record label that served as the dance sublabel of Jive Records, and was active for a short time during the mid-1990s. The label was mostly known for releasing music by the Swedish Eurodance group Rednex in North America, namely its novelty hit "Cotton Eye Joe", as well as Insane Clown Posse's third studio album, Riddle Box. The Battery Records name was later revived by Sony Music Entertainment in 2008 with a focus on hip hop music.

History
Battery was formed when Zomba's Dutch office signed Rednex and created a number-one hit with "Cotton Eye Joe." Newly appointed Jive president Barry Weiss was attempting to broaden the pop-music reach of the label group, and introducing Rednex to American listeners was one of his first steps. Suddenly Jive needed a suitable American outlet for this unique style and didn't feel that any current sub-labels were appropriate. Thus, Battery record's inaugural release was the "Cotton Eye Joe" American import in 1994. Although the song was successful, reaching #25 on the Billboard charts, it remained the group's only US hit.

While the New York City-based label largely focused on pop-oriented electronic music, it also released Insane Clown Posse's third album, Riddle Box.  The label continued for a few more years signing at least one more artist before closing its doors in 1996.

Releases

See also
List of record labels
Sony Music Entertainment

References

American record labels
Defunct record labels of the United States
Electronic dance music record labels
Electronic music record labels
Record labels established in 1994
Record labels disestablished in 1996
Hip hop record labels
Zomba Group of Companies subsidiaries
Sony Music